Lasioderma is a genus of beetles in the family Ptinidae. As of 1990, there were over 50 species in the genus.

Species
These 36 species belong to the genus Lasioderma:

 Lasioderma aterrimum Roubal, 1916 g
 Lasioderma atrorubrum Toskina, 1999 g
 Lasioderma atrum Toskina, 1999 g
 Lasioderma baudii Schilsky, 1899 g
 Lasioderma bubalus Fairmaire, 1860 g
 Lasioderma corsicum Schilsky, 1899 g
 Lasioderma desectum (Wollaston, 1861) g
 Lasioderma dolini Toskina, 2011
 Lasioderma excavatum (Wollaston, 1861) g
 Lasioderma falli Pic, 1905 i c g b
 Lasioderma flavicollis (Wollaston, 1865) g
 Lasioderma formosanum Pic, 1943 g
 Lasioderma haemorrhoidale (Illiger, 1807) i c g b
 Lasioderma hemiptychoides Fall, 1905 i c g b
 Lasioderma kiesenwetteri Schilsky, 1899 g
 Lasioderma laeve (Illiger, 1807) g
 Lasioderma latitans (Wollaston, 1861) g
 Lasioderma melanocephalum Schilsky, 1899 g
 Lasioderma micans (Mannerheim, 1829) g
 Lasioderma minutum Lindberg, 1950 g
 Lasioderma morulum Toskina, 2011
 Lasioderma mulsanti Schilsky, 1899 g
 Lasioderma multipunctatum Toskina, 1999 g
 Lasioderma obscurum (Solsky, 1868) g
 Lasioderma prolixum Toskina, 2011
 Lasioderma punctulatum Reitter, 1884 g
 Lasioderma redtenbacheri (Bach, 1852) g
 Lasioderma semirufulum Reitter, 1897 g
 Lasioderma semirufum Fall, 1905 i c g
 Lasioderma serricorne (Fabricius, 1792) i c g b (cigarette beetle)
 Lasioderma sparsum Toskina, 2011
 Lasioderma striola (Rey, 1892) g
 Lasioderma tauricum Toskina, 2011
 Lasioderma thoracicum (Morawitz, 1861) g
 Lasioderma triste Roubal, 1919 g
 Lasioderma turkmenicum Toskina, 1999 
 Lasioderma turkestanicum Reitter, 1901 g

Data sources: i = ITIS, c = Catalogue of Life, g = GBIF, b = Bugguide.net

References

Further reading

 
 
 
 
 
 

Bostrichoidea